Masatoshi Shinomaki (篠巻 政利, born October 6, 1946) is a retired Japanese heavyweight judoka, who won the world title in the open category in 1969 and 1971, placing third in 1967. He also competed at the 1972 Summer Olympics.

References

External links
 

1946 births
Living people
Japanese male judoka
Olympic judoka of Japan
Judoka at the 1972 Summer Olympics
People from Shimonoseki
Universiade medalists in judo
Universiade gold medalists for Japan
Medalists at the 1967 Summer Universiade
20th-century Japanese people
21st-century Japanese people